Mayhem (also known as Mayhem 3D) is a racing video game developed by Left Field Productions, published by Rombax Games, and distributed by Zoo Entertainment for Xbox 360 and PlayStation 3. The game is a demolition derby style game that features 3D gameplay that works on any TV.

Mayhem would be the final game developed by Left Field Productions before the company went out of business.

Graphics
The game features full 3D compatibility for any TV. It has an art style similar to MadWorld for the Wii, an oversaturated graphic novel style with the only colors being black, white, and red as the sky.

Gameplay
The career mode is split into graphic novel chapters. There are multiple different game modes to play throughout the game. There are many things to unlock with Mayhem Points and Stars, including vehicles and tracks.

Reception

The PlayStation 3 version received "mixed" reviews, while the Xbox 360 version received "generally unfavorable reviews", according to the review aggregation website Metacritic.

References

2011 video games
Monochrome video games
Racing video games
PlayStation 3 games
Video games developed in the United States
Xbox 360 games
Left Field Productions games